= Drakki railway station =

Railway station in Pakistan

Coordinates: 32°18′N 70°37′E

General information
- Owner: Ministry of Railways
- Line: Bannu-Tank branch line

Other information
- Station code: DKK
Location

Drakki railway station (Urdu: دراکی ریلوے اسٹیشن) is located on Bannu-Tank branch line in Pakistan.

== See also ==
- List of railway stations in Pakistan
- Pakistan Railways
